George Wang may refer to:

 George Wang (actor) (1918–2015), Taiwanese actor and producer
 George Wang (producer), American film and television producer